Ralf Haber (born 18 August 1962 in Altenburg, Thuringia) is a retired East German hammer thrower.

His personal best throw was 83.40 metres, achieved in May 1988 in Athens. This is the current German record.

International competitions

References

Profile

1962 births
Living people
People from Altenburg
Sportspeople from Thuringia
German male hammer throwers
East German male hammer throwers
Olympic athletes of East Germany
Athletes (track and field) at the 1988 Summer Olympics
World Athletics Championships athletes for East Germany
World Athletics Championships medalists
Competitors at the 1986 Goodwill Games